Sithonia, also known as Longos, is a peninsula of Chalkidiki, which itself is located on a larger peninsula within Greece. The Kassandra Peninsula lies to the west of Sithonia and the Mount Athos peninsula to the east. Sithonia is also a municipality, covering the Sithonia peninsula. The seat of the municipality is the town Nikiti.

Geography

Gulfs that surround the peninsula are the Singitic Gulf to the east and the Toronean Gulf to the west. The peaks of Itamos and Dragoudelis are in the center of the peninsula. The landscape is covered with vineyards, forests, grasslands, shrubland and mountains. Amongst the many historic places in Sithonia is the ancient city, the castle and the church of Agios Athanasios in Toroni, the windmills in Sykia and the 16th century church in Nikiti. 

In the northern part of the peninsula are the popular beaches of Ai Giannis, Kalogria, Elia and Lagomandra on the west coast and Livrochios, Karidi, Kavourotripes and Platanitsi on the east coast. The beaches in the southern part include Azapiko, Tristinika, Kalamitsi and Kriaritsi. 

Porto Koufo, is the largest natural harbor in Greece, which is mentioned by Thucydides as "hollow harbor"; it appears to be the fishing spot in the area. South, from the harbour's exit there is Kartalia, the most southern part of Sithonia, a very impressive area which puts its visitors under a spell with its rocky secluded beaches. 

The main villages in the peninsula are Nikiti, Neos Marmaras, Parthenonas, Sarti, Sykia, Vourvourou and Agios Nikolaos. 

In the middle of Sithonia peninsula, near the village of Neos Marmaras, is the holiday resort of Porto Carras; the place of the 2003 European Union leaders Summit. In summer the waterfront areas of Neos Maramaras, Nikiti and Sarti are especially busy.

Municipality
The municipality Sithonia was formed at the 2011 local government reform by the merger of the following 2 former municipalities, that became municipal units:
Sithonia
Toroni

The municipality has an area of 516.848 km2, the municipal unit 322.875 km2.

Places
Agios Nikolaos
Armenistis (camping) 
Elia Akti or Elia, or Olive Beach
Kalamitsi
Metamorfosi
Neos Marmaras
Nikiti
Ormos Panagias
Partenonas
Platanitsi
Porto Carras (popular resort town)
Porto Koufos or Porto Koufo
Pyrgaditika or Pyrgadikia
Salonikiou
Sarti
Sykia
Toroni
Vourvourou

See also
Mount Itamos

References

External links
Visit Sithonia
Sithonia Guide
Sithonia in Chalkidiki
Sithonia Greece travel guide and information
Visitor guide of Sithonia
Sithonia Greece More Information

Peninsulas of Greece
Municipalities of Central Macedonia
Populated places in Chalkidiki
Geography of ancient Chalcidice